The 2021–22 Liga 3 was first season of Portuguese football's third-tier league, following the reorganization which saw the Campeonato de Portugal moving one level down in the Portuguese football league system. First season, a total of 24 teams competed in this division.

Format
This competition consists of a first stage with all the teams then proceed to a promotion or relegation series depending on their performance.

First Stage

In the first stage, the 24 clubs are divided in two series (Serie A and B) of 12 teams, according to geographic criteria. In each series, teams play against each other in a home-and-away double round-robin system. The four best-placed teams of the two series will advance to the promotion series and bottom 8 teams will proceed to the relegation series.

Promotion Stage

The eight qualified teams are divided in two series of 4 teams, playing against each other in a home-and-away double round-robin system. The winners of each series will be automatically promoted to Liga Portugal 2 and will face each other in a neutral venue to determine the champion. The second best placed teams will face each other in a playoff, whose winner will face the 16th placed of Liga Portugal 2 for the last spot in Liga Portugal 2. On this stage teams will be divided as follows.

Relegation Stage

The bottom 8 teams are divided in four series of 4 teams, playing against each other in a home-and-away double round-robin system. To account for their performance in the first stage, teams will start with bonification points, with 5th placed teams starting with 8 points and 12th placed teams starting with 1. The bottom teams of each series will be relegated to Campeonato de Portugal.

Teams 
A total of 24 teams contested the league, including 2 teams relegated from the 2020–21 Liga Portugal 2, 6 teams that failed the promotion to 2021–22 Liga Portugal 2 and 16 teams qualified from the 2020–21 Campeonato de Portugal.

Cova da Piedade failed to produce valid licensing documentation to compete in the 2021–22 season of the Liga Portugal 2, so they had been relegated by the Portuguese Football Professional League to Liga 3.

Leça failed to produce valid licensing documentation to compete in the 2021–22 season of the Liga 3, so they had their promotion denied by the Portuguese Football Federation. As a result, Sanjoanense (3rd place in Promotion Serie 3) were invited to play in the third tier for the 2021–22 season.

Stadium and locations

First stage
In the first stage, the 24 clubs were divided in two series (Serie A and B) of 12 teams, according to geographic criteria.

Serie North

Serie South

Second stage
In the second stage, the 24 clubs were divided in 2 promotion series (Serie 1 and 2) of 4 teams and 4 relegation series (Serie 1, 2, 3 and 4) of 4 teams.

Promotion series

Serie 1

Serie 2

Relegation series

Serie 3

Serie 4

Serie 5

Serie 6

Third stage

Third place playoff

First leg

Second leg

Alverca advances to Promotion play-offs.

Championship final

Number of teams by district

References 

Portugal
3